Canucha bouvieri is a moth in the family Drepanidae. It was described by Charles Oberthür in 1916. It is found in Sichuan, China.

References

Moths described in 1916
Drepaninae